Rock Creek is a  intermittent stream flowing in Lake and Harney counties in the U.S. state of Oregon. Rock Creek has a  watershed.

From its source northeast of Warner Peak, the creek flows generally northeast, with segments that flow generally north and others that flow generally east, across the Hart Mountain National Antelope Refuge. The creek flows through Hot Springs Campground, where Bond Creek, a named tributary, enters from the right. The creek passes by  Antelope Hot Springs downstream of the campground. Further downstream, it flows through the refuge headquarters, where it passes under Frenchglen Road. The creek then runs roughly parallel to Poker Jim Ridge, on the left, before heading east into Rock Creek Reservoir and then into Catlow Valley. Catlow Valley is a closed basin, with no outlet to the sea.

See also
List of rivers of Oregon
List of longest streams of Oregon

References

Rivers of Oregon
Rivers of Harney County, Oregon
Rivers of Lake County, Oregon